Saredon is a civil parish in the district of South Staffordshire, Staffordshire, England. It contains seven listed buildings that are recorded in the National Heritage List for England. All the listed buildings are designated at Grade II, the lowest of the three grades, which is applied to "buildings of national importance and special interest".  The parish contains the villages of Great Saredon and Little Saredon, and the listed buildings consist of houses, farmhouses and farm buildings.


Buildings

References

Citations

Sources

Lists of listed buildings in Staffordshire